Copaxa is a genus of moths in the family Saturniidae first described by Francis Walker in 1855.

Species
The genus includes the following species:

Copaxa andensis Lemaire, 1971
Copaxa anikae Brechlin & Meister, 2010
Copaxa apollinairei Lemaire, 1978
Copaxa australoescalantei Brechlin & Meister, 2010
Copaxa bachuea Wolfe, 2005
Copaxa bella Wolfe, Naumann, Brosch, Wenczel & Naessig, 2005
Copaxa canella Walker, 1855
Copaxa chrisbrechlinae Brechlin & Meister, 2010
Copaxa cineracea W. Rothschild, 1895
Copaxa conlani Brechlin & Meister, 2010
Copaxa copaxoides (Dyar, 1912)
Copaxa curvilinea Schaus, 1912
Copaxa cuscoandensis Brechlin & Meister, 2010
Copaxa cuscoexpandens Brechlin & Meister, 2010
Copaxa cydippe (Druce, 1894)
Copaxa decrescens Walker, 1855
Copaxa denda Druce, 1894
Copaxa denhezi Lemaire, 1971
Copaxa escalantei Lemaire, 1971
Copaxa evelynae Wolfe & Lemaire, 1993
Copaxa expandens Walker, 1855
Copaxa flavina Draudt, 1929
Copaxa flavobrunnea Bouvier, 1930
Copaxa garciorum Brechlin & Meister, 2010
Copaxa herbuloti Lemaire, 1971
Copaxa ignescens Lemaire, 1978
Copaxa intermediata Wolfe, 2005
Copaxa joinvillea Schaus, 1921
Copaxa kitchingi Brechlin & Meister, 2010
Copaxa koenigi Lemaire, 1974
Copaxa lavendera (Westwood, 1854)
Copaxa lavenderoguatemalensis Brechlin & Meister, 2010
Copaxa lavenderohidalgensis Brechlin & Meister, 2010
Copaxa lavenderojaliscensis Brechlin & Meister, 2010
Copaxa litensis Wolfe & Conlan, 2002
Copaxa lunula Wolfe & Conlan, 2003
Copaxa madrediosiana Brechlin & Meister, 2010
Copaxa mannana Dyar, 1914
Copaxa mazaorum Lemaire, 1982
Copaxa medea (Maassen, 1890)
Copaxa mielkeorum Brechlin & Meister, 2010
Copaxa moinieri Lemaire, 1974
Copaxa muellerana (Dyar, 1920)
Copaxa multifenestrata (Herrich-Schaeffer, 1858)
Copaxa novocineracea Brechlin & Meister, 2009
Copaxa orientalis Lemaire, 1975
Copaxa pararufinans Brechlin & Meister, 2010
Copaxa parvohidalgensis Brechlin & Meister, 2010
Copaxa pascoandensis Brechlin & Meister, 2010
Copaxa rudloffi Brechlin & Meister, 2010
Copaxa rufa Draudt, 1929
Copaxa rufijaliscensis Brechlin & Meister, 2010
Copaxa rufimichoacanensis Brechlin & Meister, 2010
Copaxa rufinans Schaus, 1906
Copaxa sapatoza (Westwood, 1854)
Copaxa satellita Walker, 1865
Copaxa satipoexpandens Brechlin & Meister, 2010
Copaxa schmidti Brechlin & Meister, 2010
Copaxa semioculata (C. & R. Felder, 1874)
Copaxa simson Maassen, 1881
Copaxa sinjaevi Brechlin & Meister, 2010
Copaxa sophronia Schaus, 1921
Copaxa syntheratoides W. Rothschild, 1895
Copaxa troetschi Druce, 1886
Copaxa trottierorum Beneluz, 1986
Copaxa vanschaycki Brechlin & Meister, 2010
Copaxa wernermeisteri Brechlin & Meister, 2010
Copaxa wolfei Meister, Naumann, Brosch & Wenczel, 2005
Copaxa yungaskoenigoides Brechlin & Meister, 2010
Copaxa yungaspandens Brechlin & Meister, 2010
Copaxa yungescens Brechlin & Meister, 2010

References

Saturniinae